Masehlaneng is a village situated northwest of the town of Mokopane in the Waterberg District of the Limpopo province of South Africa. It is about 8 km from Mokopane, which is two hours from Gauteng by road. The population is multiethnic. The dominant languages in the area are Northern Sotho and Northern Ndebele.

The village shares boundaries with the villages Ga-Madiba, Moshate, Sekgakgapeng and Maroteng. It also borders Magopane River and Mogalakwena River.

The village is currently represented in the Mogalakwena Municipality.

Culture 
The village is located in a bushveld environment and has influences from Northern Sotho, Ndebele, Tsonga and SeSotho cultures.

Schools 

 Mmadikana Secondary School is a public secondary school and Motshitshi Primary School is a public primary school located at Masehlaneng

Soccer Grounds 
There are two soccer grounds where soccer is played:

 Smiling Soccer Ground
 Bananas Soccer Ground

River 
Magopane River is a small river that supplies water to Mogalakwena River. Dams may be opened due to an overflow of rainwater during the summer. There are a few bridges that cross through the river (such as the N11 road).

References 
 Mogalakwena Local Municipality 2011/12 IDP
 Mogalakwena Local Municipality Economic Development Plan
 A case study of chiefly and local government in Vaaltyn
 Motshitshi Primary School, Mesehlaneng
 Mmadikana Secondary School, Mesehlaneng
 Water Pollution in Magopane River

Populated places in the Waterberg District Municipality